Private Valentine: Blonde & Dangerous (also known as Major Movie Star in the United Kingdom) is a 2008 American comedy film starring Jessica Simpson. Simpson plays the title role of Megan Valentine, a down-on-her-luck actress who enlists in the United States Army.

Plot
When film star Megan Valentine (Jessica Simpson) suddenly finds herself broke and humiliated in the public eye, she wanders from the wreckage of a car accident and witlessly enlists in the United States Army, hoping that it will change her life. The spoiled actress immediately finds herself at odds with her tough drill sergeants and the harsh discipline of army life, leading to many humorous situations.

In the end, Valentine wins the respect of her fellow trainees, and they all graduate together. She also recovers her house and the money that she lost. In the end, she changes and becomes a better person.

Cast
 Jessica Simpson as Private Megan Valentine
 Vivica A. Fox as First Sergeant Louisa Morley
 Ryan Sypek as Drill Sergeant Mills Evans
 Olesya Rulin as Private Elisa Petrovich
 Jill Marie Jones as Private Connie Johnson
 Keiko Agena as Private Hailey Hamamori
 Aimee Garcia as Private Vicky Castillo
 Cheri Oteri as Private Sarah Jeter
 Gary Grubbs as Captain Peter Greer 
 Andy Milonakis as Joe Kidd 
 Steve Guttenberg as Sidney Green
 Michael Hitchcock as Nigel Crew 
 Bryce Johnson as Derek O'Grady
 Katie Chonacas as Amber 
 Travis Schuldt as Sergeant First Class Harrison
 Kurt Fuller as Cousin Barry
 Lara Grice as Jinny Valentine

Production notes
Private Valentine: Blonde & Dangerous is set at Fort Jackson, which is a real U.S. Army training base. It was filmed at Camp Minden, a Louisiana National Guard Camp located in Minden, Louisiana, United States.

Releases
The film was released in Russia on October 9, 2008, and in Bulgaria on November 7, 2008.

The film was released in the United States straight to DVD as Private Valentine: Blonde & Dangerous on February 3, 2009. The film was released in the United Kingdom as Major Movie Star on May 18, 2009.

In popular culture
On the October 29, 2008, episode of Late Night with Conan O'Brien, host O'Brien brought up the movie and mentioned reports that Simpson's acting was "so bad" that it would not be released "in any country where English is the primary language". The show then displayed the poster because it was refused a clip. The next night, the show played a clip from a bootleg copy before having recurring guest star James Lipton make a passionate plea to Simpson to reconsider her decision to withhold the film, saying the "bad defines the good" and the apparent "85 minute stinkbomb" of Major Movie Star only would help to highlight how good Schindler's List really was.

References

External links
 
 
 Official DVD trailer
 Sony Pictures DVD Site
 PRIVATE VALENTINE: BLONDE & DANGEROUS

2008 films
2008 direct-to-video films
2008 comedy films
American direct-to-video films
2000s English-language films
Films about actors
Films about American military personnel
Films directed by Steve Miner
Screen Gems films
MoviePass Films films
Films about the United States Army
Films produced by Boaz Davidson